Frits Wijngaard (26 July 1926 – 2 March 2012) was a Dutch boxer. He competed in the men's welterweight event at the 1948 Summer Olympics.

References

1926 births
2012 deaths
Dutch male boxers
Olympic boxers of the Netherlands
Boxers at the 1948 Summer Olympics
Sportspeople from Upper Austria
People from Linz-Land District
Welterweight boxers